Samuel Bolton Ashworth (11 March 1877 – 30 December 1925) was an English footballer who played as a defender in the Football League for Burslem Port Vale, Everton, Manchester City and Stoke. He played for Manchester City in their victory in the 1904 FA Cup Final, and also helped both City and Everton to finish second in the First Division.

Career
Ashworth played for Staffordshire clubs Stoke Alliance, Fenton Town, Stafford Wednesday, Stafford Rangers, and Stoke Nomads, before joining Stoke in 1901. He played 29 times in 1901–02, being used in all three midfield positions, but lost his first team place at the Victoria Ground in 1902–03 and made only 10 appearances. He left for Manchester City at the end of the season, who had just won promotion into the First Division. In his one season at Hyde Road, he won the 1904 FA Cup at Crystal Palace after injury prevented Billy Holmes from playing; City beat Bolton Wanderers 1–0. City also finished second in the Football League, three points behind The Wednesday. However Ashworth featured in just 22 games all season, and then went on to play for Reading in the Southern League, and then played 11 league games for First Division runners-up Everton in 1904–05, before returning to Staffordshire with Second Division side Burslem Port Vale in October 1905. His appearances during the season were restricted due to other commitments, and he left the Athletic Ground in the summer. He later played for North Staffs Nomads, Northern Nomads, Sheffield and Richmond Association. He returned to Stoke in 1920 and became a club director until his death in 1925.

Personal life 
In 1915, a year after the outbreak of the First World War, Ashworth enlisted in the Royal Garrison Artillery. He served on the Western Front in France and Belgium and was gassed during fighting on the Ypres Salient, spending three months in hospital. Ashworth was mentioned in despatches in November 1915 and was commissioned as a second lieutenant the following month.

Career statistics

Honours
Manchester City
FA Cup: 1903–04

References

1877 births
1925 deaths
People from Fenton, Staffordshire
Footballers from Stoke-on-Trent
English footballers
Association football defenders
Stafford Rangers F.C. players
Stoke City F.C. players
Oxford City F.C. players
Manchester City F.C. players
Reading F.C. players
Everton F.C. players
Port Vale F.C. players
Northern Nomads F.C. players
Sheffield F.C. players
English Football League players
Southern Football League players
English cricketers
Staffordshire cricketers
English Football League representative players
British Army personnel of World War I
Royal Garrison Artillery officers
FA Cup Final players